David Whitehill is an Australian TV personality, former Cleo Bachelor of the Year (2001) and dolphin trainer for Sea World on the Gold Coast.

Career 

Whitehill has hosted and appeared on a variety of TV shows from 2002, including Hot Source, Brisbane Extra, Mornings with Kerri-Anne, Just for Laughs: Gags, So Fresh and Saturday Afternoon! and lifestyle travel show Escape.

In 2009 he was one of five Australians shortlisted for The Best Job In The World competition run by Tourism Queensland.

In July 2010 it was announced that he would co-host the Qantas in-flight lifestyle programs.

References

External links 
 David's Official Website
 Escape

Living people
Australian television presenters
People from the Gold Coast, Queensland
Year of birth missing (living people)